The Boy Who Fell Into a Book is a 1998 family play by British playwright Alan Ayckbourn. It was premièred as the Stephen Joseph Theatre's 1998 Christmas production to mark the 1999 National Year of Reading. It is about a boy, Kevin, who finds himself teamed up with a fictional detective, Rockfist Slim, on a journey through the books on his shelves.

This play is regarded as the forerunner to the adult's play Improbable Fiction, performed in 2005 which featured a man wandering through the stories of his writing circle colleagues.

Musical adaptation

In July 2014, a musical adaptation of the play by Paul James, with music by Cathy Shostak and Eric Angus was shown at The Stephen Joseph Theatre. It was directed by Ayckbourn himself and received critical acclaim. The English Touring Theatre mounted a production of the book in 2002.
 The Boy Who Fell Into a Book on official Ayckbourn site

The Cast:
Evelyn Hoskins as Kevin

Nicolos Colicos as Rockfist Slim

Katie Birtill as Monique and Mummy Wubbly

Stephen Matthews as Red Gareth and Ebeneezer

John Barr as Red Bishop and other parts

Natasha J Barnes as the White Queen and other parts

Musical Direction: Mark Warman

Reviews
 The Observer review
 The Guardian review
 What's On Stage review
 The Stage review
 The Scarborough News review
 The York Press review
 The Public Reviews review
 The Northern Echo review

References

Plays by Alan Ayckbourn
1998 plays